William Henry Greason (born September 3, 1924) is an American former professional baseball player who later became a Baptist minister. He was born in Atlanta. Greason enlisted in the United States Marine Corps during World War II and did his basic training at Montford Point. He embarked with the 66th Supply Platoon, an all-black unit, in the Pacific Theater of Operations and took part in the Battle of Iwo Jima.

Negro league career
After the war, he played professional baseball in the Negro leagues for the minor league Nashville Black Vols and Asheville Blues, and the major league Birmingham Black Barons, where he was a teammate of Willie Mays. In 1952, Greason joined minor league baseball as a member of the Oklahoma City Indians of the Double-A Texas League, where he won nine of his ten decisions and posted a 2.14 earned run average. Another successful year at Oklahoma City in 1953 led to his acquisition by the St. Louis Cardinals of Major League Baseball, where he would become the team's second African-American player, after Tom Alston.

Major League career
Greason appeared in three games for the 1954 Cardinals, two as a starting pitcher. In his May 31 debut, he took the loss after allowing five earned runs and five hits over three innings in a rain-shortened game against the Chicago Cubs. In Greason's next start, he failed to record an out against the Philadelphia Phillies and allowed one earned run. In his final MLB game, he pitched a scoreless inning of relief against the New York Giants. Altogether, Greason allowed eight hits and six earned runs in four MLB innings pitched, with four bases on balls and two strikeouts. He spent the remainder of his professional baseball career in the upper levels of the minor leagues in the Cardinal farm system, retiring after the 1959 campaign.

Ministry and later life
After his playing days, Greason studied for the ministry at Birmingham Baptist Bible College and Samford University. He became a member of the 16th Street Baptist Church and a pastor of Bethel Baptist Church of Birmingham, Alabama.

In 2011 Greason was presented with a lifetime achievement award at the annual Alabama Black Achievement Awards Gala. In 2012, the Montford Point Marines, including Greason, were awarded a group Congressional Gold Medal.

See also
 List of Negro league baseball players who played in Major League Baseball

References

External links

 and Seamheads

1924 births
Living people
African-American Baptist ministers
African-American baseball players
Birmingham Black Barons players
Cangrejeros de Santurce (baseball) players
Houston Buffaloes players
Liga de Béisbol Profesional Roberto Clemente pitchers
Major League Baseball pitchers
Oklahoma City Indians players
Omaha Cardinals players
Baseball players from Atlanta
Baseball players from Birmingham, Alabama
Rochester Red Wings players
St. Louis Cardinals players
United States Marines
United States Marine Corps personnel of World War II
African Americans in World War II
21st-century African-American people
United States Marine Corps personnel of the Korean War
African-American United States Navy personnel